This is a list of people associated with Athabasca University in Alberta, Canada. This includes faculty, notable alumni, staff, and former university Presidents. Athabasca University is a distance education university with open enrollment year round, accredited by the province and the Middle States Association of Colleges and Schools. It has served more than 260,000 students since 1970. In 2007 it began offering some classes by cell phone, and in 2008 it became the first university in North America to offer a Doctorate in distance education. In 2009, it became the first Canadian university to offer a doctorate in Business Administration (DBA).

The university teaches approximately 32,000 students per year, and has a variety of students with various learning needs. Classes are attended at the location of the student's choosing. The university has a set number of standards for students in the delivery of its programs. It offers over 700 courses, and spends $2 million a year on research.

A

B

C

D

F

G

H

K

L

M

N

O

P

R

S

T

W

Z

Presidential list

References

 
Athabasca University
Athabasca University